Lakeside Village is an open-air shopping mall located on the southern side of Lakeland, Florida, in the United States. Located off the Polk Parkway at Harden Boulevard, it is classified as a "regional mall" by the International Council of Shopping Centers, and it draws shoppers from much of the Lakeland metropolitan area.

It is also a mixed-use complex, with office space available and three hotels on site.

Since opening, the shopping center has caused businesses off of Florida Avenue to either close or relocate due to competition.

Anchor Stores 

 Bed Bath & Beyond
 Belk
 Cobb Lakeside 18 & IMAX (18-screen movie theater)
 Kohl's

References

External links 
 Shop Lakeside Village - Official Website

Shopping malls established in 2005
Buildings and structures in Lakeland, Florida
Shopping malls in Florida